Rensselaer Westerlo (May 6, 1776April 18, 1851) was a United States representative from New York and a member of the Livingston family.

Early life
Rensselaer Westerlo was born on May 6, 1776 at the Van Rensselaer Manor House in Albany in the Province of New York. He was the son of Catherine Livingston (1745–1810) and her second husband Eilardus Westerlo (1738–1790).  Catherine Livingston was the daughter of Philip Livingston (1716–1778), and widow of Stephen Van Rensselaer II, and the mother of Stephen Van Rensselaer.  Westerlo's sister, Catherine Westerlo, married John Woodworth.

Westerlo graduated from Columbia College in New York City in 1795. He studied law, was admitted to the bar, and practiced.

Career
Westerlo was active in the militia, and served as an aide to Stephen Van Rensselaer and commander of a cavalry regiment in the War of 1812.  In 1818 he became commander of New York's 3rd Cavalry Brigade with the rank of Brigadier General.

Westerlo was elected as a Federalist to the Fifteenth Congress (March 4, 1817 – March 3, 1819). He was not a candidate for reelection and resumed the practice of law.

Personal life
On May 5, 1805, he married Jane Lansing (1785–1871), daughter of Chancellor John Lansing Jr. Together, they had six children:
Catherine Westerlo (1806–1890)
Elizabeth Van Rensselaer Westerlo (b. 1816)
Cornelia Lansing Westerlo (1826–1876)
Mary Lansing Westerlo (1826–1876)
Eliardus Westerlo (d. 1859)
Joanna Westerlo

He died in Albany on April 18, 1851 and was interred at Albany Rural Cemetery.

References
Notes

Sources

Van Rensselaer Genealogy and History

1776 births
1851 deaths
Columbia College (New York) alumni
Politicians from Albany, New York
American people of Dutch descent
Burials at Albany Rural Cemetery
Livingston family
Federalist Party members of the United States House of Representatives from New York (state)
Lansing family